The 1970 Canadian-American Challenge Cup was the fifth season of the Can-Am auto racing series.  It consisted of FIA Group 7 racing cars running two-hour sprint events.  It began June 14, 1970, and ended November 1, 1970, after ten rounds.

The 1970 season began only a few days after the death of defending champion Bruce McLaren.  McLaren had been testing the new M8D for his Can-Am team when he was killed.  Denny Hulme was joined by friend Dan Gurney in the second McLaren, but he was replaced by Peter Gethin following sponsorship conflicts.  The team overcame the loss of their leader to win nine of ten races during the 1970 season.

Schedule

Season results

Drivers Championship
Points are awarded to the top ten finishers in the order of 20-15-12-10-8-6-4-3-2-1.  Only the best seven finishes out of ten rounds counted towards the championship.  Points earned but not counting towards the championship are marked by parenthesis.

References

 
 

 
Can-Am seasons
Can-Am